Scott E. Page is an American social scientist and John Seely Brown Distinguished University Professor of Complexity, Social Science, and Management at the University of Michigan, Ann Arbor, where he has been working since 2000. He has also been director of the Center for the Study of Complex Systems at the University of Michigan (2009–2014) and an external faculty member at the Santa Fe Institute (2000–2005 and 2007–present).

Page is known for his research on and modeling of diversity and complexity in the social sciences. His specific research interests include path dependence, culture, collective wisdom, adaptation, and computational models of social life. In addition to teaching at Michigan, Page also instructs the Teaching Company educational video series "Understanding Complexity"  and the online "Model Thinking" course created by Coursera.

Biography
Page received his B.A. in mathematics at the University of Michigan, Ann Arbor, in 1985. He then received an M.A. in mathematics at the University of Wisconsin–Madison in 1988 and an M.A. in managerial economics from the Kellogg Graduate School of Management at Northwestern University in 1990. In 1993 he earned a Ph.D. in Managerial Economics and Decision Sciences also from the Kellogg School under the guidance of Stanley Reiter and Roger Myerson (his advisors), Mark Satterthwaite, and Matthew O. Jackson.

Before taking his current position at Michigan, he taught at the California Institute of Technology (1993-7), the University of California - Los Angeles (1994) and the University of Iowa (1997-9).

Model Thinking MOOC and The Model Thinker
In early 2013, Page gave an online-course on the MOOC-platform Coursera called "Model Thinking". Due to massive participation this course has been repeated several times.  In 2018, Page published The Model Thinker with Basic Books. The book summarizes and extends the material covered in the online course and promotes a "many-model thinking" approach to confronting complex problems.

Awards
Page was inducted into the American Academy of Arts and Sciences in 2011. He is the recipient of multiple National Science Foundation grants, including the IGERT award (2002–present), and the Biocomplexity Project SLUCE award (2001-6). He has also been the recipient of a MacArthur Foundation Initiative on Inequality and Poverty Research Grant and a Guggenheim Fellowship.

Page has received several teaching awards from Caltech, Northwestern, and Michigan, including, most recently, the University of Michigan Distinguished Diversity Scholarship and Engagement Award (2009).

See also
 Agent-based model
 Collective Wisdom
 Complex Systems
 Path dependence
 Santa Fe Institute

References

Bibliography
Books
 
 
 
 
 
 

Journal articles
  Pdf.

External links
 Scott E. Page's Home Page

Year of birth missing (living people)
Living people
American social scientists
University of Michigan College of Literature, Science, and the Arts alumni
University of Wisconsin–Madison College of Letters and Science alumni
Kellogg School of Management alumni
University of Michigan faculty
Santa Fe Institute people